Bethel Grove may refer to any of three places in the United States:

Bethel Grove, Autauga County, Alabama
Bethel Grove, Lauderdale County, Alabama
Bethel Grove, New York